Kardam may refer to:

Religion 
 Kardama, a character in Hindu mythology

People
 Kardam of Bulgaria (AD 735–803), ruler of Bulgaria
 Kardam, Prince of Turnovo (1962–2015), Bulgarian crown prince (eldest son of King Simeon II)
 Kanta Kardam, Indian politician

Places 
 Kardam, Dobrich Province, a village in north-eastern Bulgaria
 Kardam Buttress, a buttress in the South Shetland Islands, Antarctica
 Kardam, Targovishte Province